Australia West Express is a planned submarine cable linking Western Australia and Djibouti with en route landings at Diego Garcia. It is expected to create the fastest latency link between Europe and Australia, avoiding the Malaysian/Indonesia choke point.

Australia West Express is planned to have landings at Djibouti where it can interconnect with other submarine cables EIG, SEACOM, EASSy, SEA-ME-WE 3 and soon AAE-1 and SEA-ME-WE 5.

References

External links
Submarine Cable Map
Greg's Cable Map
GoTo Networks - Australia West Express

Submarine communications cables in the Indian Ocean
Internet in Europe
Internet in Australia
Internet in Africa